Chart Sutton is a civil parish and small village on the edge of the Weald of Kent, England.

The village is small, with around 800 inhabitants, but has a village hall, a pop-up shop and a park; although the corner shop, which housed the Post Office, and the village's public house, The Buffalo's Head, have both now closed.
 
St Michael's Church, parts of which date back to the 14th century, lies outside the village centre, in between Chart Sutton and Sutton Valence.  The church shares its vicar with Sutton Valence and East Sutton; the three villages are collectively known as the "Three Suttons" and have close connections with each other. They now share their vicar with Headcorn

Mike Fitzgerald, the councillor for the village and for Boughton Monchelsea, served as Mayor of Maidstone 2006–2007.

References

External links

Villages in Kent
Civil parishes in Kent